Burakin is a small town near Kalannie in the eastern Wheatbelt region of Western Australia.

The townsite was gazetted in 1928. The name is an Aboriginal word of unknown meaning, and was suggested by the Wongan Hills Road Board in 1927. The original spelling was to have been Borrikin.

Burakin is the junction for the branch railway line to Bonnie Rock. The line was completed on 27 April 1931, but services beyond Beacon were withdrawn from late 1997.

In 2000 and 2001 Burakin was the epicentre of a series of earthquakes now known as the Burakin Swarm – a significant series of seismographic events that are considered important in understanding the South West Seismic Zone.

References

External links

Towns in Western Australia
Wheatbelt (Western Australia)